Beecroft railway station is located on the Main Northern line, serving the Sydney suburb of Beecroft. It is served by Sydney Trains T9 Northern Line services.

History
The original Beecroft station opened on 17 September 1886 approximately adjacent to the current Beecroft tennis courts, relocating north to its present site on 7 March 1892. The disused down platform was demolished in the early 1990s. A disused dock platform for produce was located to the west of the platform.

As part of the North Sydney Freight Corridor project, an electrified passing loop opened to the west of the station in June 2016.

Services

Transport links
Busways operates one route from Beecroft station:
553: to North Rocks Shopping Centre and West Pennant Hills

Hillsbus operate two routes from Beecroft station
635: to Castle Hill
651: Rouse Hill station to Epping station

Beecroft station is served by one NightRide route: 
N80: Hornsby station to Town Hall station

References

External links

Beecroft station details Transport for New South Wales

Hornsby Shire
Main North railway line, New South Wales
Railway stations in Sydney
Railway stations in Australia opened in 1886